Hieronymus Franciscus (Jerôme) Lambrechts (12 October 1839 – 25 November 1896) was a Dutch politician.

Lambrechts was a Limburg lawyer and school overseer who was a representative for the Roermond district. As one journalist wrote, he belonged to the 'incumbent members'. He spoke rarely and always briefly.

Lambrechts was a son of Jan Jacob Lambrechts (1804–1858), Member of Parliament from 1849–1850 and Maria Gertudis Nelissen (–1900). He was a member of the House of Representatives for more than twenty years. Lambrechts died in 1896 in Papenhoven.

References

1839 births
1896 deaths
19th-century Dutch politicians
Members of the House of Representatives (Netherlands)
People from Echt-Susteren